The Kirkby Rent Strike was a 14-month-long rent strike initiated by 3,000 tenants in October 1972 in the town of Kirkby, outside Liverpool, against the Housing Finances Act. The strike caused a £1 rent rise.  A group of women on the Tower Hill estate formed a discussion and support group to help themselves and their families through the factory closure crisis. When the Housing Finances Act was passed, these women formed an Unfair Rents Action Group and responded by organizing the rent strike

References

History of Liverpool
Housing in the United Kingdom
Housing protests
Housing in England
1970s in Liverpool